The Taupō solar farm is a proposed photovoltaic power station in the Taupō District of New Zealand. It is to be built on a 1022 hectare site 35 km east of Taupō. The farm will be owned by Nova Energy and will be the largest in New Zealand when complete.

The project applied for resource consent in September 2022. Resource consent was granted in November 2022. Construction on the first stage of 150 MW is expected to begin in 2023, with operations beginning 18 months later.

See also

 Solar power in New Zealand

References

Solar power in New Zealand
Proposed renewable energy power stations in New Zealand
Taupō District